Muruqucha (Quechua muru blunt; mutilated; stained; pip, grain; smallpox, qucha lake, hispanicized spelling Morococha) is a mountain at a small lake of that name in the Andes of Peru which reaches an altitude of approximately . It is located in the Junín Region, Yauli Province, Marcapomacocha District.

Yanaqucha ("black lake") is the name of the larger lake southwest of Muruqucha.

References

Mountains of Peru
Mountains of Junín Region